Pazhavanthangal railway station is one of the railway stations of the Chennai Beach–Chengelpet section of the Chennai Suburban Railway Network. It serves the neighbourhood of Pazhavanthangal and surrounding areas.

History
Pazhavanthangal railway station lies on the Madras Beach—Tambaram suburban section of the Chennai Suburban Railway, which was opened to traffic on 11 May 1931. The tracks were electrified on 15 November 1931. The section was converted to 25 kV AC traction on 15 January 1967.

See also

 Chennai Suburban Railway
 Railway stations in Chennai

References

External links
Pazhavanthangal railway station at Indiarailinfo.org

Stations of Chennai Suburban Railway
Railway stations in Chennai
Railway stations in Kanchipuram district